Tribute to the Nation's Constitution and Flag, also known as the School Children's Monument, is a bronze sculpture by Torleif S. Knaphus, installed outside the Salt Lake City and County Building in the U.S. state of Utah.

References

Bronze sculptures in Utah
Monuments and memorials in Utah
Outdoor sculptures in Salt Lake City
Sculptures of children in the United States